Crown Shyness is the second studio album by British punk rock band Trash Boat, released on 20 July 2018 by Hopeless Records. It was produced by Andrew Wade at The Audio Compound in Orlando.

Background
Crown Shyness was recorded at The Audio Compound in Orlando, Florida with producer Andrew Wade. He mixed the album, before it was mastered by Alan Douches.

Release
Trash Boat announced their second studio album, Crown Shyness, on 14 May 2018 alongside the lead single "Shade". Their second single "Inside Out" was released on 20 June. The band released their third single "Old Soul" on 19 July

The album was released on 20 July, debuting at No. 2 on Billboard's Heatseekers Albums Chart.

Critical reception

The album received largely positive reviews.
The Soundboard Reviews in a positive review said: "Crown Shyness is a genuinely great album, not only seeing Trash Boat settle on an identity that works for them, but also moving away from pop-punk almost entirely, now dialing up the hardcore influences that’s seen them get the most praise, as well as Wonder Years-esque alt-rock that makes this melancholy-drenched sound so much more secure in its intent."

In an 5/5 review from New Noise Magazine, Nathaniel Lay said: Trash Boat have a grittier, hardcore-influenced style of punk rock that combines the best elements of Polar Bear Club, Rise Against, and even Thrice. Their sophomore full-length with Hopeless, Crown Shyness, is a ten-track experience of pure bliss, perfectly blending melody and rage into one hard-hitting and memorable disc."

Track listing
All songs written by Trash Boat.

Personnel
Personnel per booklet.

Trash Boat
 Tobi Duncan – lead vocals
 Ryan Hyslop – guitar
 Dann Bostock – guitar
 James Grayson – bass guitar
 Oakley Moffatt – drums

Production and design
 Andrew Wade – producer, recording, mixing
 Alan Douches – mastering
 Sam Dunn – album artwork, layout

Charts

References

2018 albums
Hopeless Records albums